MTV World Stage Live In Malaysia was a concert series in Malaysia from 2007 to 2015.

On August 15, 2009, MTV Asia staged the an outdoor concert at Sunway Lagoon resort in Kuala Lumpur. The event was attended by over 15,000 people and featured a real-time microblogging application where comments and 'tweets' via SMS were displayed on giant screens at the concert venue. The six-hour-long concert was edited into a two-hour special that aired on MTV Asia on August 28, 2009.

Artist lineups

See also
MTV Southeast Asia

References

External links
Official MTV World Stage Live In Malaysia website
MTV Asia (MTVWorldStage) on Twitter

MTV
2007 establishments in Malaysia
2015 establishments in Malaysia
Recurring events established in 2007
Recurring events established in 2015